Kalapana may refer to:
Kalapana (band), a Hawaiian pop music group
Kalapana, Hawaii, a town on the Island of Hawaii
Kalapana of Hawaiʻi (1255-1285), Chief of Hawaii